Ciaron O'Reilly (born 1960) is an Australian anti-war campaigner, peace protester, social justice campaigner and Catholic Worker, having been "engaged in ... protests, acts of civil disobedience and trials in England, Ireland, and his native Australia." He has also become one of the most visible and active practical and theoretical exponents of the ideas of Christian anarchism, arguing that this "'is not an attempt to synthesise two systems of thought' that are hopelessly incompatible, but rather 'a realisation that the premise of anarchism is inherent in Christianity and the message of the Gospels.'"

In a landmark case, on 5 July 2006 O'Reilly went to trial at Ireland's Four Courts for the third time for disarming a US navy warplane at (civil) Shannon Airport in the early hours of 3 February 2003: this group action became known as the Pitstop Ploughshares. Two earlier trials in 2005 had ended in mistrial; O'Reilly and four others (Deirdre Clancy, Nuin Dunlop, Karen Fallon and Damien Moran) were acquitted by an Irish jury on 25 July 2006.

Early life

Ciaron O'Reilly was born in Brisbane, Queensland, Australia, in 1960. He was educated at the Sisters of Mercy in Brisbane and later by the Christian Brothers at St. James College, Fortitude Valley. He is of Irish descent. He received a BA degree majoring in literature and history.

He took part in the 1980s civil rights, social justice and free speech movement in Queensland, Australia, opposed to state Premier Joh Bjelke-Petersen.

He was working as a relief teacher in Queensland when he first came into contact with the Catholic Worker Movement (CW), founded in the United States by Dorothy Day and Peter Maurin during the Great Depression. O'Reilly subsequently founded Brisbane's West End Catholic Worker community along with Jim Dowling and Angela Jones, aiming to address social issues including youth homelessness among the Aboriginal community. He described the CW as composed of three practices which together constitute a life of integrity: living in intentional community, practicing the works of mercy, and nonviolent prophetic witness. He aims to personally enact this through living in community with the poor, prison visitation, and direct action against war. Catholic Workers in Brisbane were also concerned about the threat posed by nuclear weapons and the uranium mining industry and its direct and indirect effects on those in the Third World. Together with other members of the Brisbane Catholic Worker, he took an active role in highlighting the involvement and complicity of the Australian government, corporate and military sectors in supporting Indonesia's brutal and illegal 25-year occupation of East Timor.

Activities in the USA

In 1989 Ciaron left Brisbane to go to the US to work in soup kitchens and skid rows. In 1990 he moved to Washington, DC into a Trinitarian-run home, where he helped give support and shelter to homeless women and children. Here he practiced nonviolent witness against the White House. He spent four years in the United States from 1989 to 1993 and was mentored by the well-known Catholic activists, Daniel Berrigan and his brother Philip. He was there for the invasion of Panama and first Gulf War and attended nonviolent demonstrations at the Pentagon on a weekly basis. He witnessed and met young people deployed in the US army, navy and the National Guard, including women who were deployed to fight despite having recently given birth. 

During the 1991 Gulf War, O'Reilly was a member of the 'ANZUS Ploughshares' group which attacked a B-52 Bomber which was on 20-minute scramble alert, at Griffiss AFB near Utica, New York. Their actions put the aircraft out of action for the next two months at the height of the US bombing campaign in Iraq. Together with the other members of the group, he was arrested and sentenced to 13 months in the US penal system. After his return to Australia, O'Reilly took part in the 'Jabiluka Ploughshares' group action which disabled uranium mining equipment in the Northern Territory of Australia in 1998.

He was there for Hiroshima Day when Margaret Thatcher and George H. W. Bush imposed sanctions on Iraq. On the morning of 1 January 1991, O'Reilly, together with Moana Cole from New Zealand and Susan Frankel and Bill Streit, members of the Dorothy Day Catholic Worker in Washington, D.C., calling themselves the ANZUS (Australia, New Zealand and US) Peace Force Plowshares, entered the Griffiss Air Force Base in Rome, New York.  After cutting through several fences, Bill and Sue entered a deadly force area and hammered and poured blood on a KC-135 (a refueling plane for B-52s) and then proceeded to hammer and pour blood on the engine of a nearby cruise missile-armed B-52 bombers that could be used in Iraq. 

Simultaneously, O'Reilly and Cole entered the base at the opposite end of the runway, and made a sign of the cross with blood on the runway, spray-painted "Love Your Enemies - Jesus Christ" "No More Bombing of Children in Hiroshima, Vietnam, Iraq, or Anywhere!" and "Isaiah Strikes Again." They hammered upon the runway chipping at two sections, one being nearly 5 feet in diameter, before they were detained. In their action statement they declared that they came together from three different countries to reclaim the acronym from the ANZUS Treaty and create a "new pact for peace, which is the way of the Lord." They also asserted they were acting to prevent war in the Persian Gulf and called upon people to resist war and oppression nonviolently. In their indictment they cited the US government for war crimes and violations of international law. 

All four were indicted on 9 January 1991 on federal charges of conspiracy and property destruction and faced a maximum sentence of 15 years in prison. They went to trial in Federal Court in Syracuse, New York in May and were convicted by a jury. On 20 August, they were sentenced to twelve months in prison and ordered to pay $1800 in restitution.

Time spent in the UK

O'Reilly was based in the Liverpool Catholic Worker from 1996 to 1999 and also involved with the London Catholic Worker while also working with the Simon Community. On Monday 10 December 2001, O'Reilly, Susan Clarkson and Scott Albrecht from London Catholic Worker were arrested and charged with criminal damage at a demonstration outside Northwood Headquarters in Northwood, Hertfordshire. The three sprayed red paint onto the sign at the entrance to the base because they stand up against oppression and war, set up small placards, knelt under the sign and prayed until they were arrested by the police. The demonstration was in response to the rising number of civilian victims of the US aerial bombing campaign against Afghanistan.

Period in Ireland

He was house-sitting in Ballyfermot in Dublin when he arrived in Ireland. He first worked in Clancy Barracks with young heroin users and then went onto work with chronic alcohol abusers in Dublin's first ‘wet shelter,’ in Aungier Street. 'Wet shelters' were places where homeless alcoholics were allowed to drink. It was a 'stimulating environment' and it was where he learned to deal with aggression and conflict. During his time there, 15 people died due to their addictions. He worked there from December 2002 to October 2003 full-time, and has been a relief worker there since. 

Pitstop Ploughshares

O'Reilly and the Pitstop Ploughshares were arrested for nonviolently disarming a US Navy Warplane at the civilian Shannon Airport in County Clare, Ireland. On 3 February, O'Reilly and four other activists entered a hangar at the airport, and damaged a US Navy war plane that was on its way to Iraq. In the hangar they set up a shrine to the innocent of Iraq and prayed until the authorities arrived. Following their arrests the five spent between 4 and 11 weeks in Limerick Prison. They went to trial in Dublin circuit criminal court in March and October 2005 on two counts of Criminal Damage, €100 and $US2.5 million. Penalties, if convicted, would have carried a maximum of ten years' imprisonment. 

The March 2005 trial collapsed on the 6th day when Judge O'Donnell agreed with Defence counsel arguments that his adjudication was tainted with a 'perception of bias' which was undermining the defendants' right to a presumption of innocence. The judge agreed, called a mistrial, dismissed the jury, and instructed the media not to report on the reasons for the mistrial. 

The October 2005 re-trial collapsed on the 10th day, after Judge Donagh MacDonagh agreed with Defence counsel that his attendance at the Bush inauguration in 2001 (amongst other meetings with Bush) was grounds for his removal from the case, in that his role was tainted with a "perception of bias". 

On a visit to Australia in February 2006 O'Reilly was pulled aside on arrival in Brisbane and interviewed by two Australian Security Intelligence Organisation (ASIO) officers. O'Reilly publicly accused ASIO of heavy-handed tactics, saying, "I felt it was a kind of intimidation basically; they were asking what my plans were for the next three months, in terms of politically organising against Australian involvement in the war. I don't see what business that has to do with them if their main thing is security."

The third trial of the Pitstop Ploughshares started on 10 July 2006 and resulted in a unanimous 'Not Guilty' verdict on both charges after 12 days of testimony and legal argument. Judge Miriam Anderson had agreed on Day 9 of proceedings with the defense counsel after extensive submissions and legal argument on the applicability of the statutory "lawful excuse" defence.
After 4½ hours of deliberation the Dublin jury of seven women and five men returned and gave their decision that all the accused should be acquitted as they honestly believed they were acting to save lives and property in Iraq and Ireland, and that their disarmament action was reasonable, taking into consideration all the circumstances. Over 100 international and Irish anti-war activists converged on Dublin for both trials. They were occasions for public witness against the war, with evenings of celebration of the disarmament and public meetings concerning ongoing Irish involvement in the war on Iraq.

Recent activity

He spent approximately three further years at London Catholic Worker's Giuseppe Conlon House in Harringay, London, from shortly after its opening in 2010. He is presently living in his native Australia. He is noted both for "his reflections on Christian anarchism, and partly for his example in putting these reflection[s] into practice". In recent years he has been associated with the campaigns in support of Julian Assange, Edward Snowden, and Ben Griffin, who became O'Reilly's godson.

The Ploughshares Movement

The term "Ploughshares" is a reference to the biblical prophecy of Isaiah Ch. 2 and Micah Ch. 4 "They shall beat their swords into ploughshares, and their spears into pruning-hooks; nation shall not lift up sword against nation, neither shall they learn war any more". 

On 9 September 1980, Daniel Berrigan, a Jesuit priest and his brother Philip, a Josephite priest and six others (the "Plowshares Eight") began the Plowshares Movement when they entered the General Electric Nuclear Missile Re-entry Division in King of Prussia, Pennsylvania where nose cones for the Mark 12A warheads were made. They hammered on two nose cones, poured blood on documents and offered prayers for peace. They were arrested and initially charged with over ten different felony and misdemeanor counts. On 10 April 1990, after nearly ten years of trials and appeals, the Plowshares Eight were re-sentenced and paroled for up to 23½ months in consideration of time already served in prison. Their legal battle was dramatically re-created in Emile de Antonio's 1982 film, In the King of Prussia, which starred Martin Sheen and featured appearances by the Plowshares Eight as themselves.

Harry Browne, a journalist and lecturer, wrote a book about the action at Shannon airport called, Hammered by the Irish: How the Pitstop Ploughhares disabled a U.S. Warplane - with Ireland's blessing. The book contains an introduction by Daniel Berrigan. Since this action over seventy Plowshares actions have taken place around the world against weapons of war, several involving O'Reilly.

See also
 List of peace activists

Publications

See also

Pitstop Ploughshares
Plowshares movement
Catholic Worker Movement
Martin Newell
Ben Griffin

References

External links
 Ciaron O'Reilly on Christian anarchism and the Catholic Workers London Catholic Worker conference, July 2010
 Interviewed by Andrew Denton: Enough Rope ABC TV Australia 19 June 2006
 Peace on Trial
 ANZUS Peace Force Ploughshares
 Jabiluka Ploughshares
 Interview with Ciaron O'Reilly early 2006

1960 births
Australian Christian pacifists
Australian anti–Iraq War activists
Australian people of Irish descent
Australian poets
Australian Roman Catholics
Catholic anarchists
Catholic Workers
Date of birth missing (living people)
Irish Christian socialists
Irish anti-war activists
Living people
People from Brisbane
People from County Dublin
Roman Catholic activists